Actinodaphne malaccensis is a species of tree in the laurel family, Lauraceae. It is native to Malaysia and Singapore. It is used for timber.

References

malaccensis
Trees of Malaya
Taxonomy articles created by Polbot
Plants described in 1886
Taxa named by Joseph Dalton Hooker